Quercus × warei  is a hybrid oak tree in the genus Quercus. The tree is a hybrid of Quercus robur f. fastigiata (upright English oak) and Quercus bicolor (swamp white oak).
The hybrid is named for the American dendrologist George Ware, former Research Director at the Morton Arboretum in Illinois.

Cultivars
Two cultivars, 'Long' and 'Nadler' were patented. 'Nadler' was patented and trademarked in 2007. The mother tree of both cultivars is a Quercus robur f. fastigiata (upright English oak, a narrow form) growing in Columbia, Missouri. The ortet of 'Nadler' is growing in Jacksonville, Illinois. Approximately 1000 seeds were collected from the mother plant in 1974 and propagated, with two selected for further development as cultivars, which are now propagated clonally.

The 'Long' cultivar is marketed under the trade designation , and the 'Nadler' cultivar under the trade designation . 'Nadler' oaks are 11 m (35 ft) tall with a limb spread of 2 m (6 ft) at an age of 30 years. 'Nadler' and 'Long' are highly resistant to powdery mildew, which plagues the Q. robur parent. This clone also exhibits heterosis (hybrid vigor).

References 

Dirr, Michael A. 2009. Manual of woody landscape plants: Their identification, ornamental characteristics, culture, propagation and uses. 6th edition. Stipes Publishing Co. Champaign, Illinois. pp. 933
Growing Trends: The Official Publication of the Illinois Green Industry Association.  "Landscape Architects Meet Heritage Trees... Heritage Trees Meet Some Landscape Architects."  July 2007, pp. 16, 19
2008–2009 Catalog of Robinson Nursery Inc.
2009–2010 Catalog of Heritage Seedlings Inc., KCK Farms LLC, Kuenzi Turf and Nursery, Robinson Nursery Inc. and Seseter Farms.

External links 
Kindred Spirit Additional Info

warei
Hybrid plants